Procession (Live at Toulouse) is a live album by South African pianist and composer Chris McGregor's big band Brotherhood of Breath. It was recorded on May 10, 1977, at Halle aux Grains in Toulouse, France, and was released on LP by Ogun Records in 1978. In 2013, Ogun reissued the album on CD with three extra tracks.

Reception

In a review for AllMusic, Scott Yanow wrote: "Although the themes are strong, the emphasis is on improvising, particularly by the full group together, and there are plenty of intense sections... Recommended to open-eared listeners, this is one of the Brotherhood of Breath's best recordings."

The Guardian'''s John Fordham called the band "a cauldron of South African dance grooves, American free jazz and Duke Ellington harmonies," and commented: "This music sounds rough and unfinished, rather like a big-band version of Albert Ayler's early recordings. But it has Ayler's haunting mix of anguish, soul and hope, too."

Ken Waxman of Jazz Word stated: "the craftiness of the arrangements is such that sounds are both lilting and grounded in technical mastery. Adding just the bare minimum of notes to direct the band..., McGregor, plus bassists Johnny Dyanni and Harry Miller plus drummer Louis Moholo... effortlessly induce the beat. But at the same time stimulating horn vamps pull back enough so notable chases between trumpet triplets and slippery reed extensions are clearly heard."

Writing for The Quietus'', Sean Kitching noted that the album provides "a taste of the full, gloriously melodic yet free jazz-squall of the group in full flight."

LP track listing

 "Sunrise on the Sun" (Chris McGregor) – 17:30
 "Sonia" (Mongezi Feza) – 4:35
 "Kwhalo" (Dudu Pukwana) – 18:35

CD track listing

 "You Ain't Gonna Know Me 'Cos You Think You Know Me" (Mongezi Feza) – 6:33
 "Sunrise on the Sun" (Chris McGregor) – 17:10
 "Sonia" (Mongezi Feza) – 8:42
 "Kwhalo" (Dudu Pukwana) – 18:35
 "TBS" (Chris McGregor) – 8:19
 "Andromeda" (Chris McGregor) – 4:05

Personnel 
 Chris McGregor – piano
 Dudu Pukwana – alto saxophone
 Mike Osborne – alto saxophone
 Evan Parker – tenor saxophone
 Bruce Grant – baritone saxophone, flute
 Harry Beckett – trumpet
 Marc Charig – trumpet
 Radu Malfatti – trombone
 Johnny Dyani – bass
 Harry Miller – bass
 Louis Moholo – drums

References

1978 live albums
Brotherhood of Breath live albums
Ogun Records live albums